The 1970–71 season was the 69th season in which Dundee competed at a Scottish national level, playing in Division One, where the club would finish in 5th place. Domestically, Dundee would also compete in both the Scottish League Cup and the Scottish Cup, where they would get knocked out by Celtic in the quarter-finals of the League Cup, and by Hibernian in the quarter-finals of the Scottish Cup. Dundee would also compete in the first edition of the Texaco Cup, being knocked out by English side Wolves in the 1st round.

Scottish Division One 

Statistics provided by Dee Archive.

League table

Scottish League Cup 

Statistics provided by Dee Archive.

Group 3

Group 3 table

Knockout stage

Scottish Cup 

Statistics provided by Dee Archive.

Texaco Cup

Player statistics 
Statistics provided by Dee Archive

|}

See also 

 List of Dundee F.C. seasons

References

External links 

 1970-71 Dundee season on Fitbastats

Dundee F.C. seasons
Dundee